Sheikh Khalifa bin Jassim bin Muhammed bin Jassim bin Muhammed Al Thani (born 1959) is the chairman since 2014 of the Federation of the GCC Chambers of Commerce and Industry.

He is a member of the Qatari royal family and businessman. He is the ninth son of Sheikh Jassim bin Muhammed bin Jassim Al Thani, the Minister of Electricity and Water from 1970 to 1989.

Education

He got a bachelor's degree in political and economic sciences from University of Portland in the United States.

Business life

After graduation he worked in the Amiri Diwan as Head of Political Affairs Department till 1987 when he was appointed Director General of the Ministry of Economy and Commerce till 1993.

During his work at the Ministry he chaired Qatar official delegations to many countries.

Since 2006 he has been Chairman of the Qatar Chamber of Commerce & Industry where he has been responsible for a number of local and oversees investments. In May 2013 he was reported to be considering a visit to Israel to promote commercial ties an to invest "hundreds of millions of dollars" in Israeli companies.

Currently he is also the Chairman of the Qatar International Center for Arbitration and Reconciliation.

He became the chairman in 2014 of the Federation of the GCC Chambers of Commerce and Industry.

References

External links
 Reuters photo

Khalifa bin Jassim
1959 births
Living people
University of Portland alumni